Mikhail Andreyevich Gashchenkov (born 19 June 1992) is a Russian football central midfielder. He plays for FC SKA-Khabarovsk.

Club career
He made his debut in the Russian Second Division for FC Lokomotiv-2 Moscow on 18 April 2011 in a game against FC Dynamo Vologda.

On 11 February 2020 he joined FC SKA-Khabarovsk on loan until the end of the 2019–20 season.

On 1 July 2021, he signed with Kazakhstan Premier League club FC Akzhayik.

On 11 December 2021, he returned to FC SKA-Khabarovsk.

Career statistics

Club

Notes

References

1992 births
Footballers from Moscow
Living people
Russian footballers
Association football midfielders
FC Lokomotiv Moscow players
FC Khimik Dzerzhinsk players
FC Khimki players
FC Amkar Perm players
FC Akhmat Grozny players
FC SKA-Khabarovsk players
FC Nizhny Novgorod (2015) players
FC Akzhayik players
Russian Premier League players
Russian First League players
Russian Second League players
Kazakhstan Premier League players
Russian expatriate footballers
Expatriate footballers in Kazakhstan
Russian expatriate sportspeople in Kazakhstan